Falcon Alkoholfri Arena is a football stadium in Falkenberg, Sweden. It is home to Allsvenskan club Falkenbergs FF and seats 5,500 spectators. The naming rights for the stadium are owned by Carlsberg Group, and the stadium is named after the Carlsberg-owned brand Falcon's non-alcoholic beer.

It was inaugurated on 2 April 2017 with the Superettan game Falkenbergs FF–Östers IF, 0–2.

References

Football venues in Sweden
Sport in Falkenberg
Sports venues completed in 2017
Buildings and structures in Halland County
Falkenbergs FF
2017 establishments in Sweden